Ponnani Lighthouse  is situated in Ponnani, Malappuram district, Kerala on the south bank of the Bharathappuzha river. It was commissioned on 17 April 1983. The tower has a circular cross-section and a height of 30 meters. The light source is a metal halide lamp. The lighthouse has direct drive facility. The Ponnani port is located on the estuary of River Bharathappuzha (the longest river of Kerala) and Tirur River. 

A flag staff used to assist the craft to negotiate the entrance to the port prior to a steel mast with an oil wick being hoisted in 1937. In 1948 a steel trestle was with a gas flasher was installed. After the present tower was constructed in 1983, the light source was replaced on 23 July 1995.

See also 

 Ports in Kerala
 List of lighthouses in India

References

External links 
 
 Directorate General of Lighthouses and Lightships
 Remaining Date for Ponnani Municipality Election 2020

Lighthouses in Kerala
Buildings and structures in Malappuram district
Transport in Malappuram district
Lighthouses completed in 1983
1983 establishments in Kerala